Ladybrook may refer to:

Ladybrook, a district of Andersonstown, Northern Ireland
Ladybrook Valley, a valley in Stockport, England